Ali Nagar Pali is a village in the Indian state of Bihar. The oldest language of India, Pali, is the main language.

History 
This village came to be known as Pali because Buddha originated from this region. During his life, the people built many Viharas and Stupas (Buddhist monuments), some of which survive.

Geography 
It is bordered by Patna (the capital city of Bihar) to the north and Gaya to the south. Two well-known university towns of India - Nalanda and Rajgeer - are close to this village.

The Village is divided into sections. Amarpur Pali: Named for Amarapali, who stayed there for many years. Nigar Pali is the eastern part of Pali, named after the battle between the people of Kako and Pali. The battle was fought over  control of water, ultimately leading the people of Pali to break the dam. It was built on the canal for the purpose of irrigation. 'Nigar' is an Urdu word for irrigation. Makhdumpur Pali  was named for Shahabuddin Pir Jagjoth, who was the father of Bibi Kamal of Kako. Whenever he met with her, he came to Pali.

References 

Villages in Jehanabad district